8a-Phenyldecahydroquinoline (8A-PDHQ) is a high affinity NMDA antagonist developed by a team at Parke Davis in the 1950s. It is a structural analog of phencyclidine with slightly lower binding affinity than the parent compound. (-)-8a-Phenyldecahydroquinoline has an in vivo potency comparable to that of (+)-MK-801.

References 

Arylcyclohexylamines
Dissociative drugs
NMDA receptor antagonists
Quinolines
Phenyl compounds